Chim-Pom (stylized "Chim↑Pom") is an artist collective formed in Tokyo in 2005, when all the members were in their twenties.

The group is somewhat influenced by Makoto Aida, as three of the members had been apprentices and Ellie had modeled for him. The collective has been described as "neo-Dadaist" and "the enfant terrible of Japan’s art world". Many of their projects have tackled provocative social themes.

History

Chim-Pom first gained attention in 2006 with a project titled , an installation of taxidermied rats captured from Shibuya district, which were painted to resemble Pikachu, the naming a riff on Takashi Murakami's "Superflat" reading of Japanese aesthetics.
Don't Follow the Wind is long term exhibition started in 2012.It takes place inside the inaccessible radioactive Fukushima exclusion zone formed after the nuclear disaster. Initiated by Chim↑Pom and co-developed with the curators Kenji Kubota, Eva & Franco Mattes, and Jason Waite. They collaborated with displaced local residents and includes 12 artists developing new work inside the zone: Ai Weiwei, Aiko Miyanaga, Chim↑Pom, Grand Guignol Mirai, Nikolaus Hirsch and Jorge Otero-Pailos, Kota Takeuchi, Eva & Franco Mattes, Meiro Koizumi, Nobuaki Takekawa, Ahmet Ögüt, Trevor Paglen, and Taryn Simon.

Solo exhibitions
 2013 ‘"Hiroshima!!!!! Exhibition" Preparation Show' Hot Spot Galleries in Hiroshima City
 2013 "PAVILION", Taro Okamoto Memorial Museum, Tokyo
 2012 "Chim↑Pom", PARCO Museum, Tokyo
 2012 "Beautiful World: SURVIVAL DANCE", PROJECT FULFILL ART SPACE, Taipei
 2011 "LEVEL 7 feat. 'Hiroshima!!!!’,” Maruki Gallery for the Hiroshima Panels, Saitama
 2011 "Chim↑Pom", MoMA PS1, New York
 2011 "K-I-S-S-I-N-G", The Container, Tokyo
 2011 "SURVIVAL DANCE", MUJIN-TO Production, Tokyo
 2011 "REAL TIMES", MUJIN-TO Production, Tokyo (traveled to Standard bookstore, Osaka)
 2010 "Imagine", MUJIN-TO Production, Tokyo
 2009 "FujiYAMA, GEISHA, JAPAnEse!!,” MUJIN-TO Production, Tokyo
 2009 "Good to be human", YAMAMOTO GENDAI, Tokyo
 2009 "Hiroshima!!,” NADiff a/p/a/r/t, Tokyo
 2009 "Disposed Dick", Gallery Vagina (a.k.a. MUJIN-TO Production), Tokyo
 2009 "Hiroshima!,” Vacant, Tokyo
 2008 "Oh My God! –A Miami Beach Feeling–,” MUJIN-TO Production, Tokyo
 2008 "Becoming Friends, Eating Each Other or Falling Down Together / BLACK OF DEATH curated by MUJIN-TO Production", hiromiyoshii, Tokyo
 2008 "Japanese Art is 10 Years Behind", NADiff a/p/a/r/t, Tokyo
 2007 "Thank You Celeb Project – I'm BOKAN", MUJIN-TO Production, Tokyo
 2007  "Oh My God!,” MUJIN-TO Production, Tokyo
 2006 "SUPER☆RAT", MUJIN-TO Production, Tokyo

Selected group exhibitions
 2017 "First Things Don't Come First", curated by Native Art Department International, the Fabulous Festival of Fringe Film, Durham, Ontario, Canada
 2013 "SHIBUKARU MATSURI", Shibuya PARCO, Tokyo
 2013 "Atomic Surplus", CCA Muñoz Waxman Galleries, New Mexico
 2013 "adidas Originals PRESENTS BETTER NEVER THAN LATE", Kodachi Seisakujo, Tokyo
 2013 "Now Japan; Exhibition with 37 contemporary Japanese artists", Kunsthal KAdE, the Netherlands
 2013 "inToAsia: Time-based Art Festival 2013 – MicroCities", Stephan Stoyanov Gallery, New York
 2013 "Why not live for Art? II – 9 collectors reveal their treasures", Tokyo Opera City Art Gallery, Tokyo
 2013 "Takahashi Collection – Mindfulness", Kirishima Open-Air Museum, Kagoshima
 2013 "MOT collection – From Me to You –Close but Distant Journeys–,” Museum of Contemporary Art Tokyo
 2013 "All You Need Is LOVE: From Chagall to Kusama and Hatsune Miku", Mori Art Museum, Tokyo
 2012 "Artists and the Disaster –Documentation in Progress–,” Contemporary Art Gallery, Art Tower Mito
 2012 "The 9th Shanghai Biennale – REACTIVATION", Shanghai Museum of Contemporary Art
 2012 "Project Daejeon 2012: Energy", Daejeon Museum of Art, South Korea
 2012 "Son et Lumière, et sagesse profonde", 21st Century Museum of Contemporary Art, Kanazawa
 2012 "Get Up, Stand Up", Seattle Art Museum
 2012 "The Angel of History – I Love Art 12 Photography", Watari-um Museum, Tokyo
 2012 "Turning Around" (curated by Chim↑Pom), Watari-um Museum, Tokyo
 2012 "Double Vision: Contemporary Art from Japan", Moscow Museum of Modern Art (traveled to Haifa Museum of Art, Israel)
 2012 "The Fire that Doesn't Go Out", Richard D. Baron Gallery, Ohio
 2012 "TPAM in Yokohama 2012", BankART Mini, Yokohama
 2011 "Life, no Peace, only Adventure", Busan Museum of Art, South Korea
 2011 "Villa Tokyo", Kyobashi area, Tokyo
 2011 "Sky of Elpis", TOKYO DESIGNERS WEEK 2011 (TDW-ART), Tokyo
 2011 "SHIBUKARU MATSURI", Shibuya PARCO, Tokyo
 2011 "City_net Asia 2011: Asian Contemporary Art Project", Seoul Museum of Art
 2011 "Mildura Palimpsest #8 – Collaborators and Saboteurs", Arts Mildura, Mildura, Australia
 2011 "Invisibleness is Visibleness: International Contemporary Art Collection of a Salaryman – Daisuke Miyatsu", Museum of Contemporary Art, Taipei
 2011 "Never give up!,” PASS THE BATON GALLERY, Tokyo
 2010 "The 29th São Paulo Biennial – There is always a cup of sea to sail in", Ciccillo Matarazzo Pavilion, Ibirapuera Park, São Paulo
 2010 "Asia Art Award", SOMA Museum of Art, Seoul
 2010 "Roppongi Crossing 2010: Can There Be Art?,” Mori Art Museum, Tokyo
 2010 "REFLECTION: alternative worlds through the video camera", Contemporary Art Gallery, Art Tower Mito
 2010 "Moving – The first and final group exhibition in MUJIN-TO, Koenji", MUJIN-TO Production, Tokyo
 2009 "Good to be a mummy", YAMAMOTO GENDAI, Tokyo
 2009 "Spooky Action at a Distance: A Big in Japan exhibition of new video works from Japanese artists", Black & Blue　Gallery, Sydney
 2009 "A Blow to the Everyday", Osage Kwun Tong, Hong Kong
 2009 "Urban Stories: The X Baltic Triennial of International Art", Contemporary Art Centre [CAC], Vilnius, Lithuania
 2009 "Winter Garden: The Exploration of the Micropop Imagination in Contemporary Japanese Art", Hara Museum of Contemporary Art, Tokyo
 2008 "DEATH BY BASEL", Fredric Snitzer Gallery, Miami
 2008 "TOKYO NONSENSE", SCION Installation L.A., Los Angeles
 2008 "KITA!!: Japanese Artists Meet Indonesia" Jogja National Museum, Yogyakarta, Indonesia
 2008 "When Lives Become Form: Dialogue with the Future – Brazil, Japan", The Museum of Modern Art of São Paulo
 2008 "New Tokyo Contemporaries", (marunouchi) HOUSE, Tokyo
 2007 "Emotion Burglar", BankART Studio NYK, Yokohama
 2007 "DAIWA RADIATOR FACTORY VIEWING ROOM vol.4", DAIWA RADIATOR FACTORY VIEWING ROOM, Hiroshima
 2007 "Re-Act: New Art Competition 2007", Hiroshima City Museum of Contemporary Art

Awards
 2007 "New Art Competition 2007", Hiroshima City Museum of Contemporary Art Award

Public collections
Mori Art Museum (JAPAN)
Museum of Contemporary Art Tokyo (JAPAN)
The Japan Foundation (JAPAN)
21st Century Museum of Contemporary Art, Kanazawa (JAPAN)
Asia Society Museum, New York (U.S.A.)
Queensland Art Gallery (AUSTRALIA)

Publications
"SUPER RAT" (Parco Publishing, 2012)
"idea ink 03 – Geijutsu Jikkohan" (written by Chim↑Pom, Asahi Publishing, 2012)
"Chim↑Pom" (Kawade Shobo Shinsha, 2010)
"Why we can’t make the sky of Hiroshima 'PIKA!’?” (co-edited by Chim↑Pom and Abe Kenichi, MUJIN-TO Production, 2009)

Discography (DVD)
 2009 3rd DVD "Joy to Love"
 2007 2nd DVD "The Making of Thank You Celeb Project – I’m BOKAN"
 2006 1st DVD "P.T.A. (Pink Touch Action)”

References

External links
 Chim↑Pom official website
 MUJIN-TO Production
 Chim Pom at The Influencers 2013

Japanese contemporary artists
Japanese artist groups and collectives
Guerilla artists